Piz Tomül (also known as Wissensteinhorn) is a mountain of the Lepontine Alps, overlooking Vals in the canton of Graubünden. With an altitude of 2,946 metres above sea level, it is the highest summit of the range lying north of Tomülpass.

References

External links
 Piz Tomül on Hikr

Mountains of the Alps
Mountains of Switzerland
Mountains of Graubünden
Lepontine Alps
Two-thousanders of Switzerland
Vals, Switzerland
Safiental